Jatt is an Arab local council in the Triangle area of Haifa District in Israel.

Etymology 
The name Jatt preserves the name Gath, Hebrew for winepress. The name Gath was used in ancient times to refer to various settlements from the Judean Lowlands in the south to the Galilee in the north. The name Gath is occasionally used in ancient sources along with a qualifier to set it apart from other locations with the same name, such as Gath of the Philistines, Gath-rimmon, Gat Carmel, Gat Hefer, and Gat Padla.

History

Antiquity
Archaeologists excavations have yielded remains from Early Bronze Age and Middle Bronze Age. Both local and imported pottery from this period has been found. A scarab, in bone, dating to the 1750–1550 BCE has also been found.

Two ancient burial sites, dating from the Roman period, were discovered in a salvage excavation conducted at Jatt during the 1980s. One of them is a large funerary complex, holding inscriptions atop each of the kokhim, revealing names of Hebrew origin (such as Miriam, Rebeca, Sarah), names common to the Herodian dynasty (Berenice, Agrippa, Herodias), and names of Roman origin (Paulus, Marcus, Tiberius), with most of those dating from the late 1st century and early 2nd century CE. Based on the findings, excavators suggest the site was used by a wealthy Jewish family of the period, which may had property in the toparchy of Narbata in the chore of Casesarea Maritima. The majority of the discoveries are from this period, but it appears that a Samaritan population used the site in the following centuries, at least up until the fifth century CE.

Aryeh Kasher asserts that Jatt was a Jewish village during the 1st and 2nd centuries CE.

Two Roman lamps have also been found here.

Archeological excavations have revealed major remains from the  Byzantine and the Mamluk eras.

Ottoman era
It had a population of 5 households, all Muslim. It paid a fixed tax of 25% on agricultural products, including wheat, barley, summer crops, goats and beehives, in addition to occasional revenues; the taxes totalled 5,500 akçe.

In 1870, Victor Guérin noted here: "Several ancient cisterns are scattered about on the rocky plateau upon which stands Jett. The houses are rudely built. In the midst of the small materials of which they are principally constructed I observed a certain number of cut stones of ancient date. In the courtyard of one house I found an old capital of white marble hollowed to serve as a mortar, and now used to grind coffee. At the foot of the hill is a  well, which probably is of ancient date." He further noted that Jatt had fourteen hundred inhabitants.

In 1882,  the Palestine Exploration Fund's Survey of Western Palestine   described it: "Evidently an ancient site ; a moderate-sized village of mud and stone on a high mound at the edge of the plain. It stands beside the main road to the north, near the junction with that from Shechem, and about 2 1/2 miles north of the road through Attil to the great plain.  The village is surrounded with wells, and has a few  olives on the west. There are caves to the north, and springs about a mile to the north-west.[..]  It may also perhaps be the Jethu, or Gath, of Thothmes III, a place north of the road which he pursued to Megiddo."

British Mandate era
In the 1922 census of Palestine conducted  by the British Mandate authorities, Jatt had a population of 680 Muslims, increasing in the 1931 census to 780 Muslim, living in 165 houses.

In the 1945 statistics the population of Jatt was 1,120 Muslims,  with a total of 9,631  dunams of land  according to an official land and population survey. 1,233 dunams were plantations and irrigable land, 8,228 used for cereals, while 31 dunams were built-up (urban) land.

Israeli era
In 1959 the town was declared a local council. In 2003 Jatt was merged with nearby  Baqa al-Gharbiyye to form the city of Baqa-Jatt. However, the merger was reversed in 2010.

Politics
Direct elections were held for the mayoralty for the first time in the 1960s, with Ali Abdul-Razzaq Malak, succeeded by Sharif Jameel Gara. Then in 1973, Ahmed Mahmoud Abu Asba was elected; he was re-elected for a second term in 1983. The 1988 elections were won by Galal Abd al-Kader Wattad, and in 1993 Ahmed Mahmoud Abu Asba returned to the mayoralty. The 1998 elections were won by Dr. Mohammad Hassan Abu Foul. 

Following the local council's re-establishment in 2010, Khaled Gharra was elected mayor. Khaled Gharra was succeeded by Muhammad Taher Wattad and was reelected in 2019. Former Knesset Member and writer Muhammed Wattad was from Jatt.

References

Bibliography

External links
   Welcome To Jatt
Survey of Western Palestine, Map 11:    IAA, Wikimedia commons

Arab localities in Israel
Local councils in Haifa District
19th-century establishments in Ottoman Syria